Godfrey Malbone Brinley (November 22, 1864 – May 6, 1939) was a tennis player from the United States, born in Perth Amboy, New Jersey.

He was a boy when tennis was first introduced to New Jersey and he took to the game quickly. At St. Paul’s boarding school in Concord, New Hampshire, he excelled in tennis and squash.

At age 17, Brinley entered the Orange Invitation tournament, where he defeated Howard Taylor in the semi-finals and J.F. Bacon in the finals to win his first top-tier title. In 1883, while studying at Trinity College, he entered the U.S. Championships in Newport and reached the quarterfinals before falling to James Dwight in three sets. In 1884, he bowed out in the second round, defeated by Taylor, but he reached the semifinals of the doubles.

In 1885, Brinley joined the ranks of the game’s top players when he won the all-comers draw at the U.S. Championships to earn a place in the Challenge Round against defending champion Richard Sears. He lost to Sears in four sets. Brinley was crowned U.S. Intercollegiate champion in 1886, beating Philip Sears of Harvard in the final in New Haven. Sears would go on to win the 1887 and 1888 titles.

He reached the challenge round at the U.S. National Championships in 1885, beating Henry Slocum and Percy Knapp before finishing runner-up to four-time defending champion Richard Sears. Brinley also reached the quarterfinals in 1883 and 1887 and was amongst the top ten American tennis players from 1885 to 1887. He continued to play competitively until 1889, when he entered the priesthood. He served as Master of School at St. Paul's in Concord from 1888–1930, and was buried there in 1939.

Grand Slam finals

Singles (1 runner-up)

Doubles (1 runner-up)

References

1864 births
1939 deaths
19th-century American people
19th-century male tennis players
American male tennis players
Sportspeople from Perth Amboy, New Jersey
Tennis people from New Jersey